Vanita Ratnam awards are the awards, instituted and given every year by the Women and child development department (formerly Social Welfare Department) of Government of Kerala to honor the women who excel in various fields of social service, education, literature, governance, science, arts and culture, health, media, sports, acting and women empowerment. The award which carries a cash prize of 300 thousand rupees each, was instituted in December 2013 and started to give away from 2014.

Vanita Ratnam Awards 2014

Vanita Ratnam Awards 2015

Vanita Ratnam Awards 2016

Vanita Ratnam Awards 2017

recipients

The awards for the year 2017 was announced on 3 March 2018 for 11 personalities, each of them to be receive a cash prize of ₹ 300 thousand and a citation.

Award presentation

The Chief Minister of Kerala, Pinarayi Vijayan presented the awards for 2017 on 8 March 2018, at a function organized at V.J.T. Hall, Thiruvananthapuram, as part of the International Women's Day celebrations. The function was presided by the minister for Health and social welfare minister, K. K. Shailaja. The occasion was the first International Women’s Day after the state government formed a separate department for women and child development.

gallery

Vanita Ratnam Awards 2018

Vanita Ratnam Awards 2019
The awards for the year 2017 was announced on 4 March 2020 by K.K. Shylaja, Minister for Health and Family Welfare, Kerala. The award will be given to 5 personalities, each of them to be receive a cash prize of ₹100,000 and a citation.

recipients

References

External links

 Press release 2018

Kerala awards
Women in India
2013 establishments in Kerala
Awards established in 2014